Lake Ruovesi is a medium-sized lake in Finland. It is situated in the municipalities of Ruovesi and Mänttä-Vilppula in the Pirkanmaa region in western Finland. The lake is a part of the Kokemäki River basin and its main inflows are the Lake Tarjanne in north and the Lake Kuorevesi in the east. The lake drains into the lake Palovesi in south, which in its turn drains into the lake Näsijärvi.

See also
List of lakes in Finland

References

Kokemäenjoki basin
Mänttä-Vilppula
Landforms of Pirkanmaa
Lakes of Ruovesi